The command command in Unix and Unix-like operating systems is a utility to execute a command. It is specified in the POSIX standard. It is present in Unix shells as a shell builtin function. The argument(s) passed is a command with its arguments. The passed command is run with the normal shell function lookup suppressed.

Examples

In the following, the ls command is run without any shell functions or aliases that may exist with the same name:

$ command ls

See also
List of Unix commands

External links

Standard Unix programs